Nutwood is an unincorporated community in Centre Township, St. Joseph County, in the U.S. state of Indiana.

History
A post office was established at Nutwood in 1886, and remained in operation until 1901. The community was a depot on the Vandalia Railroad.

Geography

References

Unincorporated communities in St. Joseph County, Indiana
Unincorporated communities in Indiana